

Goals of the tax credit
The 2009 roofing tax credit is part of a twofold plan rolled out by the US federal government.  The first and most relevant of goals was intended to stimulate the economy by motivating Americans to replace their roofs with more energy efficient roofs, thereby creating jobs by increasing the demand for labor in the roofing, manufacturing, and construction industries. The other goal of the 2009 federal roofing tax credit was to reduce carbon emissions to the environment by requiring consumers to install Energy Star products on their homes in order to receive the tax credit; the installation of energy star roofing products in homes would reduce the consumption of electricity needed to maintain the desired temperature within the residence.

Covered by the roofing tax credit
To qualify for the tax credit, the new roofing materials was required to be metal with an appropriate pigmented coating or asphalt with cooling granules compliant with energy star requirements. The Environmental Protection Agency provided a list of some products which satisfy the tax credit's requirement, but consumers should also check with the manufacturer prior to purchase to ensure the materials qualify.

The government has placed a restriction on the tax credit dictating that the new roof must be installed at the principal residence of the tax payer between January 1, 2009 and December 31, 2010. Principal residence is defined as a home owned by the party filing for the credit and used as his principal place of residence. Principal residences can include houses, houseboats, mobile homes, cooperative apartments, condominiums, or manufactured homes.

Amount of the credit
The federal roofing tax credit for energy efficiency is dependent on the cost of the materials used in the renovation. A consumer could only receive a tax credit of up to 30% of the material cost to maximum of $1,500. This credit is for funds spent on the energy-star approved materials, not on installation or labor cost. For example, if the roofing materials cost $5,000 and labor expense was $5,000 resulting in a total cost of $10,000, a tax filer would still only receive the maximum tax credit of $1,500.

The energy star difference
It is an advisable idea to utilize materials that will reduce the heat of a homeowner's residence to reduce their energy consumption and their impact on the environment. But not all consumers will derive the same benefit from the use of a reflective heat-reducing roofs in reducing energy consumption.

Reflective heat reduction roofing or a cool roof is most beneficial in hot sunny climates. If a home's roof is partially or completely shaded, the homeowner may not benefit as much as someone with in direct sunlight. However even if a homeowner's roof is shaded, they will still receive the tax credit, receive benefit of heat reduction roofing, and enjoy a high-quality environmentally friendly roof.

See also
Cool roof
Green roof

References

Energy star roofing tax

External links
 Energy-star approved product list
 Draft of Tax Form 5695
 Roofing experts
 Green roofing
 United States Environmental Protection Agency

United States federal energy legislation